James Gregory (born 1946) is an American stand-up comedian.

He was born in Lithonia, Georgia, on May 6, 1946, and worked as a salesperson until he was 36, when he began introducing performers at The Punch Line comedy club in Atlanta. His first feature act at the Punch Line was February 17, 1982.

Some of his most notable works include an album and a book titled It Could Be A Law, I Don't Know and a video called Grease, Gravy & John Wayne's Momma. Gregory's style consists of storytelling.

Gregory has appeared regularly as a guest on several syndicated radio shows, including the John Boy and Billy Show, Rick and Bubba, the Bob and Tom Show, and Steve and DC.

References

External links
 
 
 James Gregory's YouTube page

American stand-up comedians
1946 births
Living people
People from Lithonia, Georgia
20th-century American comedians
21st-century American comedians
American male comedians